Peter Tramacchi (born 8 November 1970, in Gympie, Queensland, Australia), is a former professional tennis player from Australia.

Tramacchi enjoyed most of his tennis success while playing doubles.  During his career he won 1 doubles title.  He achieved a career-high doubles ranking of World No. 45 in 1999.

Peter Tramacchi interviews other champion tennis players and teaches tennis online.

Performance timelines

Singles

Doubles

Mixed doubles

ATP career finals

Doubles: 3 (1 title, 2 runner-ups)

ATP Challenger and ITF Futures Finals

Singles: 5 (3–2)

Doubles: 14 (7–7)

References

External links
 
 
 

Australian male tennis players
Australian people of Italian descent
Tennis people from Queensland
1970 births
Living people